Chingozi Airport (or Matundo Airport) is an airport in Tete, Mozambique .

According to the BBC, a new airport may be built and the current one shut down to allow for coal mining activities.

Airlines and destinations

References

Airports in Mozambique
Tete, Mozambique
Buildings and structures in Tete Province